The following Union Army units and commanders fought in the Battle of Boydton Plank Road (October 27-28, 1864) of the American Civil War. Order of battle compiled from the casualty returns.

Abbreviations used

Military rank
 MG = Major General
 BG = Brigadier General
 Col = Colonel
 Ltc = Lieutenant Colonel
 Maj = Major
 Cpt = Captain
 Lt = Lieutenant
 Bvt = Brevet

Other
 w = wounded
 mw = mortally wounded
 k = killed in action
 c = captured

Army of the Potomac

II Corps

MG Winfield S. Hancock

V Corps

MG Gouverneur K. Warren

Escort: Cpt Napoleon J. Horrell
 4th Pennsylvania Cavalry (detachment)
Provost Guard: Cpt Paul A. Oliver
 5th New York Battalion
Ambulance Train: Cpt William F. Drum

IX Corps

MG John G. Parke

Escort: Lt William W. Neiterfield
 2nd Pennsylvania Cavalry, Companies C and H
Provost Guard: Cpt Andrew D. Baird
 79th New York

Cavalry Corps

Notes

References
 U.S. War Department, The War of the Rebellion: a Compilation of the Official Records of the Union and Confederate Armies, U.S. Government Printing Office, 1880–1901.

American Civil War orders of battle